H.M. "Harry" Koutoukas (June 4, 1937 – March 6, 2010) was a surrealist playwright, actor and teacher. Along with Sam Shepard, Lanford Wilson, Doric Wilson, Tom Eyen and Robert Patrick, Koutoukas was among the artists who gave birth to the Off-Off Broadway theatre movement of the 1960s and 1970s.

Life and work
Born Haralambos Monroe Koutoukas in Endicott, New York, Koutoukas moved to Manhattan in the early 1960s to pursue theater.

A prolific playwright, Koutoukas helped establish Off-Off Broadway venues such as La MaMa Experimental Theatre Club and the Caffe Cino with low-budget, absurdist works he liked to call "camp". In 1975 he said, "we... get together a play in a weekend, rehearse on a rooftop, rummage through the garbage for our props and, if we needed extra cash, we hustled our bodies in the streets.  We men, that is — we didn’t think we should ask the women to do it."

Describing Koutoukas' unusual artistic approach to theater, William Grimes of The New York Times wrote, "In works like Medea in the Laundromat and Awful People Are Coming Over So We Must Be Pretending to Be Hard at Work and Hope They Will Go Away, [Koutoukas] presented cartoonishly stylized characters, equipped them with arch dialogue and set them loose in outlandish situations. He obeyed no rules but those that one of his characters called 'the ancient laws of glitter.'" Though renowned in lower Manhattan, he never became as commercially successful as some of his contemporaries, such as Lanford Wilson or Sam Shepard. His works include Afamis Notes, The Brown Book, Butterfly Encounter and Turtles Don’t Dream. One play, Disarming Attachments, he described like this:

The play opens with this ruined Greek philosopher. Whenever he smiles his teeth are so bad that you see the Acropolis. He lives in a Greek take out paper cup with the Acropolis on it. And then there’s Malvina Falkland who has buck teeth: she throws them into the ocean so the Penguins can escape to the Antarctic. She is in love with this Ghetto type character; he’s a vineyard owner and then Attila the Hun comes in wearing carrier-ship battle shoes and she dances with the five headed general who always talks you to death. Then there’s the boy who’s just seen the abyss and can’t get over it.

In 1966, he received a Village Voice Obie Award for "Assaulting Established Tradition". Koutoukas also ran a theater workshop called the "School for Gargoyles" whose alumni included Gerome Ragni and James Rado, the writers of the rock musical Hair; Tom O'Horgan, the director of Hair; and the actor and playwright Harvey Fierstein. Fierstein also performed Koutoukas's "One Man's Religion/The Pinotti Papers" at La MaMa in 1975.

He won a Robert Chesley Award in 2003.

References

Further reading

 Banes, Sally. Greenwich Village 1963: Avant-Garde Performance and the Effervescent Body. Durham: Duke University Press, 1999.      
 Bottoms, Stephen J. Playing Underground: A Critical History of the 1960s Off-Off-Broadway Movement. 2004. Ann Arbor: The University of Michigan Press, 2007.
 Crespy, David A. Off-Off-Broadway Explosion: How Provocative Playwrights of the 1960s Ignited a New American Theater. New York: Back Stage Books, 2003.
 Dominic, Magie. The Queen of Peace Room. Waterloo, Ontario, Canada: Wilfrid Lauer University Press, 2002.
 Gordy, Douglas W. "Joseph Cino and the First Off-Off Broadway Theater." In Passing Performances: Queer Readings of Leading Players in American Theater History, edited by Robert A. Schanke and Kimberly Bell Marra, 303-323. Ann Arbor: University of Michigan Press, 1998. 
 McDonough, Jimmy. The Ghastly One: The Sex-Gore Netherworld of Filmmaker Andy Milligan. Chicago: Acappella, 2002.
 Stone, Wendell C. Caffe Cino: The Birthplace of Off-Off-Broadway. Carbondale: Southern Illinois University Press, 2005.
 Susoyev, Steve & Birimisa, George. Return to the Caffe Cino. San Francisco, CA: Moving Finger Press, 2006.
 Dominic, Magie & Smith, Michael Townsend: "H. M. Koutoukas 1937-2010": Fast Books, 2010.

External links
 New York Times obituary
 Playbill obituary
 Greek Reporter obituary
 Tributes by Koutoukas' friends
 H.M. Koutoukas fan page on Facebook.com
 BOMB Magazine interview, 1983
 H.M. Koutoukas' page on La MaMa Archives Digital Collections
 http://koutoukas.blogspot.com/

Images
 Hamptons.com (4th image down)
 Donaldbrooks.com (multiple images)
 Donaldbrooks.com (image, tribute poem)
 Koutoukas and Gerry Ragni
 Koutoukas' 1966 Caffe Cino play
 Charles Stanley as Koutoukas' Medea - 1
 Charles Stanley as Koutoukas' Medea - 2
 Color photo of Koutoukas with friends in the Caffe Cino
 Koutoukas with friends in the Caffe Cino
 Koutoukas with friends at benefit for the Caffe Cino
 Koutoukas with Joe Cino and friend
 Caffe Cino window poster portrait of Koutoukas
 Koutoukas with other Off-Off Broadway playwrights
 Koutoukas with Joe Cino and friends in front of the Caffe Cino
 Koutoukas with friends onstage at the Caffe Cino
 Koutoukas at 1985 Caffe Cino exhibit at Lincoln Center
 Koutoukas at installation of Joe Cino plaque
 Koutoukas watching Charles Stanley in Kill, Kaleidoscope, Kill

1937 births
2010 deaths
Writers from New York (state)
People from Endicott, New York
20th-century American dramatists and playwrights